Paradies Lagardère (formerly The Paradies Shops, Inc.) operates stores in airports, hotels, and other locations throughout the United States and Canada. Locations include specialty stores, restaurants and bookstores. The company was founded in 1960 in Atlanta, Georgia.

History
The Paradies Shops was founded by brothers Jim and Dan Paradies in 1960. Their first store was a toy shop at the Atlanta Airport that was an immediate success, and North American airport retail was born. Since 1960, Paradies has expanded to over 1035 stores in 103 airports. 
The company runs stores under brands ranging from The New York Times to different American collegiate athletic conferences as well as brands such as Brooks Brothers, Corsa, Spanx, iStore, Swarovski, Pandora, Dylan's Candy and many more. Paradies Lagardere also operates multiple fine dining food & beverage concepts within the airports.  The company was acquired by Lagardère Group, a French company, in October 2015. Since acquisition it has grown 70% and currently employs over 6000 people. Now known as Paradies Lagardère, the company comprises all of the stores formerly under The Paradies Shops and LS Retail names. In 2018, Airport Revenue News named Paradies “Best Overall Retailer” for the 23rd consecutive year. 

History: 
 1852: Louis Hachette opened the first railway Bookstore, Bibliothèques de Gare, and the travel retail industry is born. 
 1881: Hatchette developed the distribution network Messageries Hachette, and becomes the supplier to over 80,000 press outlets across France.
 1945: Hachette launched the renowned Elle Magazine.
 1960: Jim and Dan Paradies open the first Paradies Shop in Atlanta Municipal Airport.
 1986: Hachette acquired Curtis Circulation in the US, a leader in the magazine distribution market. In 1990: Hachette acquires Eastern Lobby Shops, a U.S. news and convenience retail company.
 1992: PGA TOUR and Paradies sign an agreement for the first airport retail brand partnership.
 1995: Hachette acquires The UCS Group, Canada’s largest press retailer.
 1996: Coca-Cola names Paradies its official retailer for Summer Olympic games in Atlanta.
 2000: Canada’s UCS Group merges with America’s Eastern Lobby Shops and gives birth to HDS Retail North America.
 2007: Paradies launches its Food and Beverage Division.
 2008: HDS Retail acquires a majority interest in the Phoenix-based Delstar Companies Inc., and the San Antonio-based airport retailer, News & Gift Shops International.
 2011: HDS Retail North America becomes LS travel retail North America, to align with the corporate branding of Lagardère Services’ travel retail division.
 2014: LS travel retail North America sells its Canadian urban retail locations to Gateway Newstands. The sale allows LS travel retail to focus on its core strategy – operating in travel environments.
 2015: Airport Revenue News names Paradies “Best Overall Retailer” for the 20th consecutive year.
 2015: Lagardère Travel Retail Acquires Paradies and merges it with LS travel retail North America to create the new market leader for airport concessions.
 2018: Paradies Lagardere acquires Hojeij Branded Foods (HBF)

References

External links
ParadiesLagardère.com (Company website)

Retail companies of the United States
Companies based in Atlanta
1960 establishments in Georgia (U.S. state)
Lagardère Group